QE1 may refer to:

 Queen Elizabeth I of England (1533–1603)
 RMS Queen Elizabeth, Cunard oceanliner replaced by RMS Queen Elizabeth 2
 Round 1 of quantitative easing by the United States Federal Reserve
 the (5860) 1981 QE1 asteroid
 Qe1, the algebraic chess notation for a move of the queen to square e1

See also
 QE (disambiguation)
 QE2 (disambiguation)
 QE3 (disambiguation)